Underground Railroad are a French post-punk band based in London, England. The band are on independent label One Little Indian Records  and have released three albums, Twisted Trees (2007), Sticks and Stones (2008) and White Night Stand (2011), as well as an EP, Pick the Ghost... in 2009. They toured promoting both their first two albums in the UK, and the rest of Europe, from 2007 to 2009.

They have been featured in the NME'''s "Radar" and Q magazine's "QPM show", and been played on the Zane Lowe show on BBC Radio 1. They also featured on the BBC Introducing Stage at 2008 Reading and Leeds Festival.

The band's members are Raphael Mura on drums and vocals, Marion Andrau on guitar and vocals, with JB Ganivet on bass guitar and backing vocals.
Cello player Anna Scott played on their third album White Night Stand'', and joins the band on occasional tour dates.

Discography

Albums

Singles

References

External links
 Nme.com

One Little Independent Records artists